The Naughty Naughty Pets is a Canadian animated television series by Decode Entertainment and C.O.R.E. Based on a series of children's books by Wendy Ann Gardner, the show debuted on CBC Television in 2006. Both the books and the animated show star a girl named Windywoo and her cabal of mischievous pets.

Episodes

Broadcast

The series originally ran on CBC Television in Canada between February 6 and May 17, 2006. The Naughty Naughty Pets was part of a bid by the broadcaster to target older youth audiences in its children's programming alongside other new series like Yam Roll, The Morgan Waters Show and Mr. Meaty. The channel initially skipped the show's seventh episode, "Heedley Pecked Me In The Eye", in their first run through the show for unexplained reasons. It later aired on June 12, 2006.

Internationally, The Naughty Naughty Pets has aired on Canal Once in Mexico, NHK in Japan, Kids Central in Singapore, CITV in the UK, ABC in Australia, Boomerang in the US and IRIB Pooya in Iran.

References

2000s Canadian animated television series
2000s Canadian children's television series
2006 Canadian television series debuts
Canadian children's animated comedy television series
CBC Kids original programming
Television series by DHX Media
Animated television series about children
Animated television series about mammals